Jean Baratte (7 June 1923, Lambersart, Nord – 1 July 1986) was a French international footballer who played as striker and was a manager. He played for Lille OSC and was the twelfth goal scorer in Ligue 1.

Honours
Lille
Division 1: 1945–46, 1953–54
Coupe de France: 1945–46, 1946–47, 1947–48, 1952–53

Individual
Division 1 top scorer: 1947–48, 1948–49

References
 Profile
 RSSSF
 RSSSF
 
 

1923 births
1986 deaths
People from Lambersart
French footballers
France international footballers
Association football forwards
Ligue 1 players
Lille OSC players
French football managers
Lille OSC managers
Espérance Sportive de Tunis managers
Expatriate football managers in Tunisia
CO Roubaix-Tourcoing managers
CO Roubaix-Tourcoing players
Pays d'Aix FC players
Sportspeople from Nord (French department)
Olympique Lillois players
Footballers from Hauts-de-France
Expatriate football managers in Belgium
French expatriate sportspeople in Belgium
French expatriate sportspeople in Tunisia
K.S.V. Roeselare managers
French expatriate football managers